The 1993–94 Courage League Division 4 was the seventh full season of rugby union within the fourth tier of the English league system, currently the regional divisions National League 2 South and National League 2 North, and the first using the name Division 4.  The league had been created at the start of the season by the RFU as part of their league restructuring, making tier 4 a national league (previously it had been regional) and developing a new tier 5 (Courage League Division 5), which used the old regional north/south divisions.

By the seasons end Clifton were crowned as champions, finishing 4 points clear of second place Harrogate.  Both sides would be promoted to the 1994–95 National Division 3.  At the opposite end of the table Sudbury and Sheffield would be relegated.  Sudbury would drop to Courage League Division 5 South while Sheffield would fall to Courage League Division 5 North.

Structure
Each team played home and away matches against each of the other teams, playing a total of eighteen matches each - the first time tier 4 used a home and away system. The champions and runners up are promoted to Courage League Division 3 while the bottom two teams are relegated to either Courage League Division 5 North or Courage League Division 5 South depending on their locality.

Participating teams and locations

League table

Sponsorship
Courage League Division 4 is part of the Courage Clubs Championship and is sponsored by Courage Brewery.

References

N4
National League 2 North
National League 2 South